Ahsan Ali Syed (born 23 April 1973) is an Indian businessman. He is the founder of Western Gulf Advisory, estimated to be worth approximately 8 billion pounds. He is the owner of Racing de Santander football club in Spain.

Career
Syed is the founder of Western Gulf Advisory.

Controversies
Syed has received negative publicity owing to being involved in various scams and rumours of unpaid taxes in the UK. In Australia and New Zealand he has been linked to a scam whereby businesses paid upfront for loans which never materialised.

Notes

References

1973 births
Living people
Businesspeople from Andhra Pradesh